Club Deportivo Autol is a football club based in Autol, La Rioja. Founded in 1972, they play in Regional Preferente de La Rioja – Group 1, holding home games at the Complejo Deportivo Municipal La Manzanera, with a capacity of 2,000 people.

Season to season

3 seasons in Tercera División

References

External links
Soccerway team profile

Football clubs in La Rioja (Spain)
Association football clubs established in 1972
1972 establishments in Spain